The 2015 Canadian Soccer League season was the 18th since its establishment where a total of 22 teams from Ontario took part in the league. The season began on May 9, 2015, and concluded on October 25, 2015. Toronto Croatia  won their sixth championship (ninth including Canadian National Soccer League titles)  in a 1–0 victory over SC Waterloo in the CSL Championship final held at Warrior Field in Waterloo, Ontario. In the regular season, the Serbian White Eagles clinched their fourth regular-season title, while Milton SC won their first second division championship.

The First Division saw an increase to 12 teams, while the Second Division remained the same. New additions to the first division were the return of Brantford Galaxy along with Toronto Atomic, and Scarborough SC as expansion franchises. Founding member North York Astros disbanded their professional team while Kingston FC departed to apply for League1 Ontario.

First Division

Changes from 2014 
The number of clubs in the First Division saw an increase to 12 teams of the 10 teams that played in the First Division in 2014, eight returned. The departing clubs were North York Astros a charter club with history in the Canadian National Soccer League. The other member included Kingston FC, which had intentions of applying to League1 Ontario. After a two-year hiatus, Brantford Galaxy returned to the fold. Two new teams joined for 2015, Scarborough SC, and Toronto Atomic FC. 

Toronto Atomic was granted a franchise after operating an academy in the Canadian Academy of Futbol (CAF). The acceptance of Atomic marked the return of a Ukrainian presence in the league since the 1981 season when Toronto Ukrainians played in the predecessor league. Scarborough SC was the brainchild of former player Kiril Dimitrov to provide professional soccer to the Scarborough territory. A third team, Milton SC, joined from the Second Division. Notable reforms were accepted at the 2015 annual general meeting of team owners where the allowance of import players was increased. On April 8, 2015, the league unveiled its new logo with the inclusion of the date when the league was formed under the National Soccer League banner.

Teams

Coaching changes

Results

Standings

Season statistics

Goals

Updated: December 10, 2015

Hat-tricks

Playoffs

Bracket
The top 8 teams qualified for the one-game quarter final, and a one-game semifinal that lead to the championship game played on October 25 at Warrior Field in Waterloo, Ontario.

Quarterfinals

Semifinals

CSL Championship

Individual awards 
The annual CSL awards ceremony was held in Kitchener, Ontario. The Most Valuable Player award went to Josip Keran of Toronto Croatia. The York Region Shooters went home with two accolades with the CSL Golden Boot going to former Jamaican international Richard West, and Cyndy De Thomasis was honored with the Harry Paul Gauss award. Burlington SC received the most awards with three wins. Firstly the club was given the Fair Play award, while Andrew Stinger and Nikola Stanojevic were selected as the Goalkeeper and Defender of the Year.

Ihor Melnyk, a former Ukrainian Premier League veteran was named the Rookie of the Year, and Vasyl Ishcak was voted the Coach of the Year after clinching Toronto Atomic's first postseason berth. Goran Babic was voted the Referee of the Year by the CSL Referee Committee.

Second Division

Teams 
Of the 9 teams that played in the Second Division in 2014, seven returned. Kingston FC B left when their senior team left the First Division. Milton SC moved to the First Division and their reserve team joined the Second Division. Brantford Galaxy B returned when their senior team returned to the First Division after a two-year hiatus. Toronto Atomic FC B joined when their senior team joined the First Division.

Results

Standings

Top goal scorers

Updated: December 17, 2015 
Source: http://canadiansoccerleague.ca/2015-second-division-stats/

Playoffs

Bracket
The top 8 teams qualified for the one-game quarterfinal, and a one-game semifinal that lead to the championship game played on October 25 at Warrior Field in Waterloo, Ontario.

Quarterfinals

Semifinals

Second Division Championship

Individual awards

References

2015
Canadian Soccer League
Canadian Soccer League